The year 2015 was the first year in the history of the Rizin Fighting Federation, a mixed martial arts promotion based in Japan. 2015 started with Rizin World Grand-Prix 2015: Part 1 - Iza and ended with Rizin World Grand-Prix 2015: Part 1 - Saraba  . It started broadcasting through a television agreement with  Fuji Television.

Background
On September 19, 2015 during Bellator 142 Dynamite 1 event,  it was announced that Pride FC co-founder Nobuyuki Sakakibara had signed one of the most successful and famous Heavyweight Fighter in history, Former Pride Heavyweight Champion The Last Emperor Fedor Emelianenko to headline his new promotion’s New Year’s Eve Show in Tokyo.

On October 8, 2015 The former President of Pride FC, Sakakibara held a press conference to announce his return to MMA with Rizin Fighting Federation.
Sakakibara returned to mainstream MMA, along with Nobuhiko Takada and other former Pride FC employees.

Rizin partnered with Bellator MMA to allow former Strikeforce Light Heavyweight Champion, Muhammed "King Mo" Lawal to compete the Rizin's inaugural grand prix. Eventually, King Mo won the 8 man Heavyweight tournament with a prize of $300,000.

List of events

100 Kg Heavyweight Grand-Prix bracket

Rizin World Grand Prix 2015: Part 1 - Saraba

 Rizin World Grand Prix 2015: Part 1 - Saraba  was an inaugural mixed martial arts event held by the Rizin Fighting Federation on December 29, 2015 at the Saitama Super Arena in Saitama, Japan.

Results

Rizin World Grand Prix 2015: Part 2 - Iza

 Rizin World Grand Prix 2015: Part 2 - Iza  was a mixed martial arts event held by the Rizin Fighting Federation on December 31, 2015 at the Saitama Super Arena in Saitama, Japan.

Results

External links
 http://www.rizinff.com/en/
 http://www.tapology.com/search?term=rizin&mainSearchFilter=events

Rizin Fighting Federation
2015 in mixed martial arts
2015 in Japanese sport